Brownell was a community, now extinct, in Peru Township, Miami County, in the U.S. state of Indiana.

History
A post office was established at Brownell in 1895, and remained in operation until it was discontinued in 1901. The community was a stopping point on the Winona Interurban Railway.

References

Geography of Miami County, Indiana
Ghost towns in Indiana